This is a list of yearly California Collegiate Athletic Association football standings.

CCAA standings

References

Standings
California Collegiate Athletic Association
California sports-related lists